Simon Quaglio (1795-1878) was a German stage designer of Italian extraction.  He worked mainly in Munich, and was among the first designers to use built scenery instead of painted flats.  He designed over 100 productions during his career.

Simon was part of the Quaglio family originally from the town of Laino, between Lake Como and Lake Lugano. Simon's father, Giuseppe Quaglio (1747-1828), practiced scene painting in Mannheim, Frankfurt, and Ludwigsburg. Simon's brother, Angelo Quaglio (1778-1810), was an architect and painter. He designed and painted landscapes and architectural pictures for Boisserée's work on Cologne Cathedral. Simon was also a lithographer.

References

James Anderson, The Complete Dictionary of Opera and Operetta.

External links

More works by Quaglio @ ArtNet

1795 births
1878 deaths
German scenic designers
Opera designers
18th-century Italian painters
Italian male painters
19th-century Italian painters
Italian scenic designers
19th-century Italian male artists
18th-century Italian male artists